Mehnaz Hoosein (born 30 January 1973)  is an Indian pop singer and songwriter from Mumbai, India, popularly known for her hit song 'Banoongi Main Miss India'. She is a graduate from St. Xavier's College, Mumbai.  At the age of 13, Mehnaz started her vocal training in Hindustani classical music under the tutelage of Pandit Bhavdeep Jaipurwale. She began training as a dancer with Shiamak Davar from 1988 and performed with the Shiamak Davar Institute of Performing Arts till 1995. Mehnaz achieved success with her song Miss India which won her the 1996 Channel V Music Award for Best Female Pop Vocalist. At the time, Mehnaz was managed by Diana Hayden who was crowned Miss India the same year. It was in the nineties that Indi-pop began to emerge as an alternative to film music in India when a large number of pop singers emerged on the music scene.

Early life and career

In 1996, Mehnaz won the Screen Videocon Award for Best Pop Singer for her debut album Miss India in the Non-Film Music category. Her song Main Hoon (composed by Merlin D'Souza) from the album Miss India  was featured on the soundtrack of Deepa Mehta's movie Fire. In 1997 she was featured in a multi-artist video called Wajah Muskurane Ki (A Reason to Smile) to celebrate 50 years of Indian independence and the video aired on Indian television channels. Mehnaz recorded a duet titled Senada Cinta with BMG Malaysia's recording artist Iwan in 1998.
In 1998, she sang the number Paisa paisa paisa for the soundtrack of the indie film Bombay Boys.
In 1999, Mehnaz recorded a duet called You Are The Reason with Graham Russell and Russell Hitchcock of the band Air Supply for the soundtrack of Dev Benegal's award-winning film Split Wide Open.
She released her second solo album titled Mausam with BMG Crescendo in 1999.
In the year 2000, Mehnaz recorded the song Dreamcatcher for the soundtrack of the indie film Snip!, directed by Sunhil Sippy.
She was also featured on the duet You Are The Reason on Yours Truly, the fifteenth album by Air Supply released in 2001.
Mehnaz was a judge on Channel V's, Coke V Popstars 2 in 2003.
In 2006, Mehnaz' released her third solo album Sajnaa with Universal Music India.

Mehnaz and Manooghi Hi 

In 2007, Mehnaz travelled to the United States and collaborated with local musicians who eventually formed the core of the Seattle-based band, Manooghi Hi. As lead singer of Manooghi Hi, Mehnaz brought her background and knowledge of Indian pop and Hindustani classical music to the all-American pure rock sensibilities of the band; Jonathan Zwickel of the Seattle Times said 'their sound has never before been attempted'.
Mehnaz and Manooghi Hi vocalize in several South Asian languages, including English, Urdu, Sanskrit, Hindi and Bengali.
Manooghi Hi released two albums titled Hi in 2009  and Silence in 2011.  
Mehnaz was featured on the 2012, the Barrett Martin album release "Artifact "on Sunyata Records.

In 2012, Mehnaz moved to New Orleans to pursue her dream of living in one of the most musical cities in the world. She has performed at Voodoo Fest with Leslie Blackshear Smith
Mehnaz has also performed with Master Sarode player Aashish Khan and (Shringar) Larry Sieberth, Andrew McLean, Michael Skinkus and Tim Green.
Mehnaz has been collaborating with pianist, composer and producer Lawrence Sieberth and was featured at the New Orleans Jazz & Heritage Festival 2015

Discography

Studio Albums
Miss India (1996) Crescendo Music
Mausam (1999) BMG Crescendo Music 
Sajnaa (2006) Universal Music, India
Hi (2009) Manooghi Hi Records
Silence (2011) Mowlawner Records

Soundtrack Albums
Bombay Boys (1998)
Split Wide Open (1999)
Snip (2000)

Compilation Albums
32 Smash Hits (2000) BMG Crescendo Music
Hitz Unlimited (2002) Zee Records

Featured on Albums

(2001) Air Supply, Giant Records / Warner Bros.
Clockwork (2011), Slow Bunny Records.
Artifact (2012), Barrett Martin Group, Sunyata Records.

Other Albums
A Reason To Smile (1997) Magnasound

References 

1973 births
Indian Muslims
Indian singer-songwriters
Indian pop singers
Indian women singers
Indian women singer-songwriters
Indian women pop singers
21st-century Indian singers
Living people
People from Mumbai
People from Maharashtra
Singers from Mumbai
Indian women songwriters
20th-century Indian singers
20th-century Indian women singers
21st-century Indian women singers
Women musicians from Maharashtra